The Latin letter gamma, Ɣ (minuscule: ɣ), is a letter used in some orthographies based on the Latin alphabet. Its shape, in uppercase and lowercase, is based on the lowercase shape of the Greek letter gamma (γ). Unlike the Greek gamma, the Latin gamma may have serifs.

Latin gamma is used to represent a voiced velar fricative, in the International Phonetic Alphabet, and in the alphabets of several African languages such as Yom, Dagbani, Dinka, Kabiyé, and Ewe, some Berber languages using the Berber Latin alphabet, and sometimes in the romanization of Pashto.

Lowercase Latin gamma is used in the International Phonetic Alphabet to represent the voiced velar fricative. A lowercase Latin gamma that lies above the baseline rather than crossing it represents the close-mid back unrounded vowel. In certain nonstandard variations of the IPA the uppercase form is used. The lowercase Latin gamma can also be used in contexts (such as chemical or molecule nomenclature) where gamma must not be confused with the letter y, which can occur in some computer typefaces.

Use on computers

External links
Practical Orthography of African Languages

References

Gz
Gz